Anatole Paul Broyard (July 16, 1920 – October 11, 1990) was an American writer, literary critic, and editor who wrote for The New York Times. In addition to his many reviews and columns, he published short stories, essays, and two books during his lifetime. His autobiographical works, Intoxicated by My Illness (1992) and Kafka Was the Rage: A Greenwich Village Memoir (1993), were published after his death.

Several years after his death, Broyard became the center of controversy when it was revealed that he had "passed" as white despite being a Louisiana Creole of mixed-race ancestry.

Life and career

Early life
Anatole Paul Broyard was born on July 16, 1920, in New Orleans, Louisiana, into a Black Louisiana Creole family, the son of Paul Anatole Broyard, a carpenter and construction worker, and his wife, Edna Miller, neither of whom had finished elementary school. Broyard was descended from ancestors who were established as free people of color before the Civil War. The first Broyard recorded in Louisiana was a French colonist in the mid-eighteenth century. Broyard was the second of three children; he and his sister Lorraine, two years older, were light-skinned with European features. Their younger sister, Shirley, who eventually married Franklin Williams, an attorney and civil rights leader, had darker skin and African features.

When Broyard was a child during the Depression, his family moved from New Orleans to New York City, as part of the Great Migration of African Americans to the northern industrial cities. According to his daughter, Bliss Broyard, "My mother said that when my father was growing up in Brooklyn, where his family had moved when he was six, he'd been ostracized by both white and black kids alike. The black kids picked on him because he looked white, and the white kids rejected him because they knew his family was black. He'd come home from school with his jacket torn, and his parents wouldn't ask what happened. My mother said that he didn't tell us about his racial background because he wanted to spare his own children from going through what he did."

The Broyard family lived in a working-class and racially diverse community in Brooklyn. He saw his parents "pass" as white to get work, as his father found the carpenters union to be racially discriminatory.  By high school, the younger Broyard had become interested in artistic and cultural life.

Broyard had some stories accepted for publication in the 1940s. He began studying at Brooklyn College before the U.S. entered World War II. When he enlisted in the Army, the armed services were segregated and no African Americans were officers. He was accepted as white at enlistment and he successfully completed officers school. During his service, Broyard was promoted to the rank of captain.

After the war, Broyard maintained his white identity. He used the GI Bill to study at the New School for Social Research in Manhattan.

Career
Broyard settled in Greenwich Village, where he became part of its bohemian artistic and literary life.  With money saved during the war, Broyard owned a bookstore for a time. As he recounted in a 1979 column:
Eventually, I ran away to Greenwich Village, where no one had been born of a mother and father, where the people I met had sprung from their own brows, or from the pages of a bad novel... Orphans of the avant-garde, we outdistanced our history and our humanity.

Broyard did not identify with or champion black political causes. Because of his artistic ambition, in some circumstances he never acknowledged that he was partially black. On the other hand, Margaret Harrell has written that she and other acquaintances were casually told that he was a writer and black before meeting him, and not in the sense of having to keep it secret. That he was partially black was well known in the Greenwich Village literary and art community from the early 1960s.

As writer and editor Brent Staples wrote in 2003, "Anatole Broyard wanted to be a writer – and not just a 'Negro writer' consigned to the back of the literary bus." The historian Henry Louis Gates, Jr. wrote: "In his terms, he did not want to write about black love, black passion, black suffering, black joy; he wanted to write about love and passion and suffering and joy."

During the 1940s, Broyard published stories in Modern Writing, Discovery, and New World Writing, three leading pocket-book format "little magazines". He also contributed articles and essays to Partisan Review, Commentary, Neurotica, and New Directions Publishing. Stories of his were included in two anthologies of fiction widely associated with the Beat writers, but Broyard did not identify with them.

Broyard often was said to be working on a novel, but never published one. After the 1950s, Broyard taught creative writing at The New School, New York University, and Columbia University, in addition to his regular book reviewing. For nearly fifteen years, Broyard wrote daily book reviews for The New York Times. The editor John Leonard was quoted as saying, "A good book review is an act of seduction, and when he [Broyard] did it there was no one better."

In the late 1970s, Broyard started publishing brief personal essays in the Times, which many people considered among his best work.  These were collected in Men, Women and Anti-Climaxes, published in 1980. In 1984 Broyard was given a column in the Book Review, for which he also worked as an editor. He was among those considered "gatekeepers" in the New York literary world, whose positive opinions were critical to a writer's success.

Marriage and family

Broyard first married Aida Sanchez, a Puerto Rican woman, and they had a daughter, Gala. They divorced after Broyard returned from military service in World War II.

In 1961, at the age of 40, Broyard married again, to Alexandra (Sandy) Nelson, a modern dancer and younger woman of Norwegian-American ancestry.  They had two children: son Todd, born in 1964, and daughter Bliss, born in 1966. The Broyards raised their children as white in suburban Connecticut. When they had grown to young adults, Sandy urged Broyard to tell them about his family (and theirs), but he never did.

Shortly before he died, Broyard stated that he missed his friend Milton Klonsky, with whom he used to talk every day, after Klonsky's death. Broyard said that after Milton died, "no one talked to me as an equal".

Broyard's first wife and child were not mentioned in his The New York Times obituary. Sandy told their children of their father's ancestry before his death.

Death
Broyard died of prostate cancer on October 11, 1990, at the Dana–Farber Cancer Institute in Boston.

Disclosure of African-American ancestry
In 1996, six years after Broyard's death, Henry Louis Gates criticized the writer, in a profile entitled "White Like Me" in The New Yorker, for concealing his African-American ancestry. Gates expanded his essay in "The Passing of Anatole Broyard," a piece published the next year in his Thirteen Ways of Looking at a Black Man (1997). Gates felt that Broyard had deceived friends and family by "passing" as white, but also understood his literary ambition. He wrote:
When those of mixed ancestry—and the majority of blacks are of mixed ancestry—disappear into the white majority, they are traditionally accused of running from their "blackness." Yet why isn't the alternative a matter of running to their "whiteness"?

In 2007, Broyard's daughter, Bliss, published a memoir, One Drop: My Father's Hidden Life: A Story of Race and Family Secrets. The title related to the "one-drop rule." Adopted into law in most southern states in the early twentieth century, it divided society into two groups, whites and blacks, classifying all persons with any known black ancestry as black.

Cultural references
Novelist Chandler Brossard, who knew Broyard in the late 1940s, based a character on him in his first novel, Who Walk in Darkness (1952). After the manuscript was submitted to New Directions Publishing, poet Delmore Schwartz read it and informed Broyard that the character Henry Porter was based on him; Broyard threatened to sue unless the novel's opening line was changed. It originally had read "People said Henry Porter was a 'passed Negro,'" which Brossard reluctantly changed to "People said Henry Porter was an illegitimate." Brossard restored his original text for a 1972 paperback edition.

Novelist William Gaddis, who likewise knew Broyard in the late 1940s, modeled a character named "Max" on Broyard in his first novel, The Recognitions (1955).

Given Broyard's stature in the literary world and discussions about his life after his death, numerous literary critics, such as Michiko Kakutani, Janet Maslin, Lorrie Moore, Charles Taylor, Touré, and Brent Staples, have made comparisons between the character Coleman Silk in Philip Roth's The Human Stain (2000) and Broyard. Some speculated that Roth had been inspired by Broyard's life, and commented on the larger issues of race and identity in American society. Roth stated in a 2008 interview, however, that Broyard was not his source of inspiration. He explained that he had only learned about Broyard's black ancestry and choices from the Gates New Yorker article, published months after he had already started writing the novel.

Works
1954, "What the Cystoscope Said", Discovery magazine; this is one of his best-known short stories, also included in Intoxicated by My Illness (1992)

Books
1974, Aroused By Books, collected reviews, published by Random House
1980, Men, Women and Other Anticlimaxes, collected essays, published by Methuen
1992, Intoxicated by My Illness: and Other Writings on Life and Death
1993, Kafka Was The Rage: A Greenwich Village Memoir

References

External links

 Anatole Broyard, "A Portrait of the Hipster", Karakorak blog. Broyard's notable critical dissection of the hipster phenomenon.
 "Anatole Broyard, 70, Book Critic and Editor at The Times, Is Dead", The New York Times, Friday, October 12, 1990.
 Peter S. Canellos, "Literary critic left one topic untouched: Race was a closed chapter in a prominent life", The Boston Globe, May 19, 1996
 Jim Burns, "Anatole Broyard", Penniless Press, UK
 Bliss Broyard, One Drop: My Father's Hidden Life—A Story of Race and Family Secrets, New York: Little, Brown and Company, 2007.
 "Bliss Broyard: 'One Drop' and What It Means", Fresh Air from WHYY, National Public Radio, September 27, 2007.
 Craig Phillips, "Lacey Schwartz Uproots her Family Tree", Independent Lens. Lacey Schwartz Delgado – Denial
 Bliss Broyard

1920 births
1990 deaths
20th-century African-American writers
20th-century American male writers
20th-century American non-fiction writers
African-American memoirists
African-American non-fiction writers
African-American short story writers
American memoirists
American literary critics
American male short story writers
American short story writers
Brooklyn College alumni
Deaths from cancer in Massachusetts
Deaths from prostate cancer
Impostors
Louisiana Creole people
Military personnel from Louisiana
People from Fairfield County, Connecticut
The New School alumni
The New York Times editors
United States Army personnel of World War II
Writers from Connecticut
Writers from New Orleans